Sankt Nikolai im Sölktal is a former municipality in the district of Liezen in the Austrian state of Styria. Since the 2015 Styria municipal structural reform, it is part of the municipality Sölk.

Geography
The municipality lies in the Sölktal Nature Park.

References

Schladming Tauern
Rottenmann and Wölz Tauern
Cities and towns in Liezen District